Palestine Media Watch (PMWATCH) was an organization established in October 2000 that monitored the U.S. mainstream media's coverage of the Israeli–Palestinian conflict and mobilized against what it deemed to be anti-Palestinian or pro-Israel bias in the coverage of the conflict. The organization focused mainly on issuing letter-writing action calls and publishing reports analyzing coverage. According to the group's founder,  Ahmed Bouzid,  "There's a paradigm we're trying to change: that Israelis are defending themselves and the Palestinians are attacking, and when the Israelis do something it must be a mistake or an act of self-defense." The organization's website has not been active since about 2009. The organization was the subject of a PhD dissertation by Robert Lyle Handley from the University of Texas, Austin, titled, "Palestine Media Watch and the U.S. News Media: Strategies for Change and Resistance."

See also
 Palestinian Media Watch
 Media coverage of the Arab-Israeli conflict
 American Task Force on Palestine
 American Palestine Public Affairs Forum
 Pallywood

References

External links
Palestine Media Watch and the U.S. News Media: Strategies for Change and Resistance by Robert Lyle Handley, PhD Dissertation, University of Texas, Austin, May 2010
 How Palestinians and Israelis make their images by The Economist
 Caught in the Crossfire by American Journalism Review
 Palestinians Find Their Voice Online by Online Journalism Review
 Palestinian Activism Spammed by The Nation
 Claim: U.S. Papers Downplay Palestinian Deaths  by Editor & Publisher

Mass media in the State of Palestine
Alternative journalism organizations
Advocacy groups in the United States